The 2018 Redbox Bowl was a college football bowl game that was played on December 31, 2018 at Levi's Stadium in Santa Clara, California, with kickoff at noon PST (3:00 p.m. EST). It was one of the 2018–19 bowl games concluding the 2018 FBS football season.  This was the 17th annual edition of a game that has gone by different names, and was known as the Foster Farms Bowl for the previous four years.  For 2018 the game was renamed for its new sponsor, the DVD and video game rental company Redbox.

Teams
The game was played between Michigan State of the Big Ten Conference and Oregon of the Pac-12 Conference. The two teams have met six times previously, with each winning three times.

Oregon Ducks

Oregon received and accepted a bid to the Redbox Bowl on December 2. The Ducks entered the bowl with an 8–4 record (5–4 in conference).

Michigan State Spartans

Michigan State received and accepted a bid to the Redbox Bowl on December 2. The Spartans entered the bowl with a 7–5 record (5–4 in conference).

Game summary

Scoring summary

Statistics

References

External links
 Box score at ESPN

Redbox Bowl
2018
2018 in sports in California
December 2018 sports events in the United States
Michigan State Spartans football bowl games
Oregon Ducks football bowl games